Clone is a BBC Three comedy series starring Jonathan Pryce and Mark Gatiss, centered on the creation and education of the world's first human clone. Its first series of six 30-minute episodes premiered on 17 November 2008. After a planned second series was vetoed by BBC Three, Gatiss hinted at plans for a big-screen version, however this failed to materialize.

Story
Intended to be a prototype super soldier who will eventually replace Britain's volunteer Army, his creator, the brilliant scientist Dr Victor Blenkinsop discovers, to both his horror and distaste, that his new super weapon is not quite the awe-inspiring creation he expected. In fact, the clone is more likely to hug someone than shoot them.
This modern-day Dr Frankenstein and his monster go on the run hoping to find the neurological trigger that will fix the clone and unlock his superhuman abilities. Unfortunately, they must also avoid Colonel Black and his crack team of security agents, whose mission is to find them and kill them.

Cast
Mark Gatiss as Colonel Black, The head of MI7:  Britain's most Secret of Services. The Colonel is a blood thirsty nemesis who will stop at nothing to kill Victor and the clone. He is a man with limitless power and no conscience. He kills people simply because they can't find Blenkinsop or the clone. He shows no remorse after a false lead results in the death of two innocent people, a later mistake resulting in the death of an operative who had just provided him with vital information regarding the clone's whereabouts.
Fiona Glascott as Rose Bourne, The Irish owner and bartender of The Peanut, a small pub in the even smaller village of Bletherford. Rose is a beautiful but shy young redhead of 26 who has several extraordinary abilities: a photographic memory and savant level math skills. She likens Victor's selfish sociopathic behavior to her father. Upon meeting her, Victor realizes she could be the key to unlocking the clone's dormant abilities, resolving to acquire a little piece of her brain.
Oliver Maltman as Ian, Victor's assistant, Victor's loyal lab assistant. A modern Igor, Ian is in awe of his boss and is willing to do anything it takes to help him, including being a human guinea pig or being beaten by the Secret Intelligence Services. Like Victor, Ian lacks a social life, although it's due to his shyness rather than his arrogance; he was apparently to be married, but his fiancé left him at the altar.
Stuart McLoughlin as Clone, AKA Albert, The first human clone and appears to be in his mid-twenties. Intended as a prototype super weapon, the clone emerges from his birthing tube more likely to hug someone than shoot them.  The clone is an innocent to whom everything is new, from chocolate, to laughing and dancing.  He is fascinated by everything, but is naive of basic social interaction; while he has memory engrams to allow him to function as a soldier, he can't seem to access them, although Ian speculates that they may activate eventually.
Jonathan Pryce as Dr. Victor Blenkinsop, A modern Dr. Frankenstein and the creator of the first human clone. A man who has mortgaged his entire life in the pursuit of a single goal: to take his place amongst the great names of science. Divorced three times, Victor is willing to sacrifice everything to achieve the glory he hungers for, something he can only do by fixing the clone and making him the super soldier he was designed to be.

Episodes

External links
 
 
 

2000s British comic science fiction television series
2008 British television series debuts
2008 British television series endings
BBC television sitcoms
2000s British science fiction television series
Television series about cloning
English-language television shows
2000s British sitcoms